Kimballville Farm was a large farm located east of North Highland Avenue in what is today the Morningside-Lenox Park neighborhood of Atlanta, Georgia. It was renowned for its large collection of "the finest live stock" and "the most modern equipment". There is a road in the area, Zimmer Avenue, named after the owner as of 1909, Mr. Zimmer. The farm was a landmark in what was then a rural area. Housing tracts were developed on the site of the farm in the 1920s.

References

External links
 "Famous Kimball Farm and its Citizens", p.61, Atlanta Georgian and News, Dec. 24, 1909

History of Atlanta